Samajwadi Janata Party (Rashtriya) (SJP(R)), also called as Janata Dal (Socialist) is an Indian political party founded by Chandra Shekhar, 8th Prime Minister of India in 1990–91, and led by him until his death on 8 July 2007.

Chandra Shekhar was the sole Lok Sabha MP of the party at the time of his death. The party was formed on 5 November 1990 when Chandra Shekhar and Devi Lal broke away from Janata Dal. The party was able to gather 60 MPs and form a government which lasted for seven months.

S. R. Bommai was the president of Karnataka state unit till the state unit got merged with Janata Dal in 1993 before 1994 Karnataka Assembly elections.

As of 2012 Kamal Morarka, a former cabinet minister in the union government headed by Chandra Shekhar was the head of the party. The party headquarters were located in Narendra Niketan, ITO Indraprastha Estate, New Delhi, India.

On 14 April 2015, Samajwadi Janata Party (Rashtriya), Janata Dal (United), Janata Dal (Secular), Rashtriya Janata Dal, the Indian National Lok Dal, and Samajwadi Party, announced that they would merge into a new national alliance, Janata Parivar in order to oppose the Bharatiya Janata Party.

References

External links
 Official website

Political parties in India
Janata Dal
Political parties established in 1990
1990 establishments in India
Janata Parivar
Samajwadi Janata Party (Rashtriya)